La squadra is an Italian police television series.

See also
List of Italian television series

External links
 

Naples in fiction
Italian television series